Sophie Toscan du Plantier, a 39-year-old French woman, was killed outside her holiday home near Toormore, Goleen, County Cork, Ireland, on the night of 23 December 1996.

British journalist Ian Bailey, who lived near Toscan du Plantier's home in Ireland, was a suspect arrested twice by the Garda Síochána, yet no charges were laid as the Director of Public Prosecutions (DPP) found there was insufficient evidence to proceed to trial. Bailey lost a libel case against six newspapers in 2003. He also lost a wrongful arrest case against the Gardaí, Minister for Justice, and Attorney General in 2015.

In 2019, Bailey was convicted of murder by the Cour d'Assises in Paris, and sentenced to 25 years in prison. He was tried in absentia in France after winning a legal battle against extradition. In 2020, Ireland's High Court ruled that Bailey could not be extradited.

Victim 
Sophie Toscan du Plantier, née Bouniol, was born on 28 July 1957. She was a French television producer and lived in Paris with her husband and a son from her first marriage. She had visited Ireland several times as a teenager and bought the cottage at Toormore (Irish for great omen) in 1993 as a holiday retreat. She was a regular visitor with her son. Locals knew her by her maiden name. The cottage is located in the townland of Dunmanus West in rural West Cork. She arrived alone in Ireland on 20 December 1996, with plans to return to Paris for Christmas.

Investigation 
Toscan du Plantier was found dead by a neighbour at 10:00 a.m., her body clad in nightwear and boots, in a laneway beside her house. Her longjohn bottoms were caught on a barbed-wire fence. Bloodstains were present on a gate as well as a nearby piece of slate and a concrete block. Her body was left outdoors until the State pathologist, Dr John Harbison, arrived 28 hours later. He found "laceration and swelling of the brain, fracture of the skull, and multiple blunt head injuries". The facial injuries were so severe that her neighbour could not formally identify her.

The Gardaí have been criticised for mishandling evidence and were alleged to have coerced and intimidated witnesses. A Garda Síochána Ombudsman Commission report concluded that while there was a lack of administration and management in the investigation, there was no evidence of high-level corruption.

Suspect 

Ian Kenneth Bailey was born in Manchester, England. He worked variously as a freelance journalist, sometimes published under the name Eoin Bailey, and a fish farm worker and held a market stall selling pizzas and poems. He moved to Ireland in 1991 and lived with his partner in Goleen from 1992 onwards.

Bailey was known to local Gardaí from previous incidents of domestic violence towards his partner, which had resulted in her hospitalisation. In 2001, he was convicted of assault in Skibbereen District Court. A psychiatrist's report prepared for the murder trial concluded he had a "personality constructed on narcissism, psycho-rigidity, violence, impulsiveness, egocentricity, with an intolerance to frustration and a great need for recognition. Under the liberating effects of alcohol, he had the tendency to become violent". After his failed libel case, the judge stated that "Mr Bailey is a man who likes a certain amount of notoriety, that he likes perhaps to be in the limelight, that he likes a bit of self-publicity".

Bailey denies knowing the victim. Several witnesses have contradicted this.

Bailey was informed of the murder at 1:40 p.m. by an Irish Examiner reporter. He denies telling Bailey the woman was French as he did not know this information at that stage. Several witnesses reported being told by Bailey before noon that he was reporting on a murder of a French woman. Another three witnesses stated they were offered crime scene photographs at about 11:00 a.m.

While under investigation, he continued to write news articles alleging the victim had "multiple male companions" and steering suspicion for the murder away from West Cork toward France.

In the days following the murder, Bailey was noted to have multiple scratches to his forearms as well as an injury to his forehead. He attributed these to cutting down a Christmas tree on the morning of 22 December. Investigators could not reproduce those injuries while cutting down trees, and witnesses who were with him on the evening of the 22nd, before the murder, could not recall any injuries.

Bailey and his partner gave conflicting accounts of his whereabouts on the night of the murder. In their initial statements to Gardaí, they both said Bailey had been in bed all night long. Thomas subsequently retracted that account and said Bailey had got out of bed about an hour after they had gone to bed at 10:00 p.m., and returned at 9:00 a.m. with a new injury to his forehead. Bailey changed his story to say that he got up at 4:00 a.m., wrote an article for about 30 minutes and returned to bed.

A 14-year-old boy said that two months after the killing Bailey told him that he "smashed her brains in with a rock", though Bailey disputes this. In 1998, while drinking at home with another couple after a night out, Bailey began talking to another man about the killing and said, "I did it, I did it – I went too far", though again Bailey disputes this.

Key witness 
On 11 January 1997, a woman who lived in Schull rang the Gardaí from a payphone using an alias to state she saw a man on Kealfadda Bridge at 3:00 a.m. on the night of the murder. A public appeal was made on television for her to come forward to give a statement. She called the station from her house to say she would not come forward, the call was traced and she was subsequently identified.

The woman said she was driving with a man who was not her husband and was unwilling to give evidence publicly. In 2015, under oath, she named the man as a since deceased man from Longford.

In the 2003 libel trial, she gave evidence on behalf of the newspapers that the man she saw on the bridge was Bailey.

In 2004, she was threatened with legal action by Bailey to retract her statements. In 2005, she reported being intimidated by Bailey in her shop.

In 2015, she gave evidence on behalf of Bailey in his wrongful arrest civil case. She contradicted her earlier testimony. A transcript of her testimony was referred to the DPP to examine whether she had committed perjury.

Murder trial
Under French law, extraterritorial jurisdiction applies to the murder of a French citizen anywhere in the world.

In 2007, the Association for the Truth on the Murder of Sophie Toscan du Plantier née Bouniol was founded by her family in order to advance the investigation.

In February 2010, a European Arrest Warrant was issued by a French magistrate which led to the High Court in Ireland granting an extradition order. This was appealed to the Supreme Court by Bailey. In March 2012, the appeal was granted by the Irish Supreme Court. All five judges upheld the appeal on the ground that the French authorities had no intention to try him at this stage; four of the judges also upheld the argument that the European Arrest Warrant prohibited surrendering Bailey to France because the alleged offence occurred outside French territory and there was an absence of reciprocity.

In March 2017, Bailey was arrested in Ireland on foot of a European Arrest Warrant issued by the French authorities. The warrant sought to extradite Bailey to France to stand trial for the voluntary homicide of Sophie Toscan du Plantier and the High Court of Ireland endorsed the warrant. Bailey was successful in avoiding extradition, and in 2018, a French court ruled there was "sufficient grounds" for Bailey to face trial in absentia. Bailey was convicted of murder and sentenced to 25 years in prison on 31 May 2019.

On 12 October 2020, the judge Paul Burns in Ireland's High Court ruled that Bailey could not be extradited. Later that same month, the Irish State decided not to appeal the High Court's finding, effectively ending all attempts to extradite Bailey.

During a French state visit to Dublin in August 2021, President Macron suggested that a new trial for Bailey could be arranged should he wish to travel to France.

Bandon phone recordings
In 2014, when it came to light that phone calls at Garda stations had been secretly recorded, there were claims that some recordings from Bandon Garda station had evidence of irregularities in the Toscan du Plantier investigation. The 297 recorded calls regarding the investigation which had survived a flood were investigated by the Fennelly Commission. The commission concluded that while there was evidence Gardaí were "prepared to contemplate" altering or suppressing evidence that Bailey had not committed the murder, there was no evidence Gardaí had actually done so. It did find that Gardaí improperly disclosed confidential information about the investigation to journalists and other civilians.

Garda review 
In June 2022 it was reported that the Garda Serious Crime Review Team would conduct "a full review" of the murder case.

"True crime" accounts 
Various true crime accounts have been produced:
 The murder was the subject of a 2018 true-crime podcast miniseries titled West Cork, produced by Audible and hosted by documentarian Jennifer Forde and investigative journalist Sam Bungey.
An hour-long television documentary The du Plantier Case produced by RTÉ and presented by Philip Boucher-Hayes was aired in July 2017.
A television series Murder at the Cottage produced by Jim Sheridan started airing in June 2021. It is a five-part series by Sky Crime.
 A documentary series Sophie: A Murder in West Cork was made available for streaming on Netflix on 30 June 2021.
 A podcast Unsolved Murders: True Crime Stories produced by Parcast Network, Episodes 137 & 138 titled Film Fatale.
 A podcast Mens Rea: A True Crime Podcast, Episode 3 titled The murder of Sophie Toscan du Plantier & trial by press.
 A book Death in December: The story of Sophie Toscan du Plantier by Michael Sheridan was published in 2004. 
 A book The Murder of Sophie: How I Hunted and Haunted the West Cork Killer by Michael Sheridan was published in December 2020. 
 A book A Dream of Death by Ralph Riegel was published in June 2020.
 A book Murder at Roaringwater by Nick Foster was published in May 2021.

See also
Minister for Justice Equality and Law Reform v Bailey

References

Sources
Primary
Irish court judgments:
2010 European arrest warrant:   IEHC 177 allowed;  IESC 16 overturned;  IEHC 289 costs to Bailey.
2014 Phoenix article  IECA 141 High Court judge ought to have recused himself
2016 European arrest warrant:  IEHC 482 refused
2007 suits for damages:  IECA 203 refused Thomas;  IECA 220 refused Bailey except retrial re unlawful disclosure of confidential information;  IECA 63 refused appeal and cross-appeal;  IESCDET 154 refused appeal;  IESCDET 155 refused cross-appeal

French court judgment:
 

Other:
 
 

Secondary

Citations

1957 births
1996 deaths
Deaths by beating in Europe
Deaths by person in the Republic of Ireland
December 1996 events in Europe
Female murder victims
Fugitives wanted by France
Fugitives wanted on murder charges
French murder victims
French people murdered abroad
Garda Síochána
History of County Cork
People convicted in absentia
Unsolved murders in Ireland
1996 murders in the Republic of Ireland